Adam Seth Boehler (born June 23, 1979) is an American businessman and government official who was unanimously confirmed by the U.S. Senate to serve as the first CEO of the U.S. International Development Finance Corporation. He is currently the CEO of Rubicon Founders, a health care investment firm based in Nashville.

He previously served in the Trump administration as Director of the Center for Medicare and Medicaid Innovation, as well as Senior Advisor for Value-based Transformation for Health and Human Services Secretary Alex Azar and Deputy Administrator of the Centers for Medicare and Medicaid Services. He joined CMS in April 2018.

Early life and education 
Boehler was born in Albany, New York on June 23, 1979. Boehler's father is a physician. Boehler graduated magna cum laude from the Wharton School of the University of Pennsylvania in 2000. He was a summer college roommate of Jared Kushner, with whom he would later work on a Trump administration team coordinating tests for COVID-19. During college, Boehler worked for a summer at the Financial and Fiscal Commission, a government agency managed by the Parliament of South Africa.

Early career 
Boehler started his career at Battery Ventures, a technology venture capital firm that focuses on investments in software and emerging technologies. Boehler was also an Operating Partner at Francisco Partners, a global private equity firm based in San Francisco focusing on healthcare. Boehler founded and was Chairman of Avalon Health Solutions, a provider of laboratory benefit management services. 

Previously, Boehler was the founder and CEO of Accumen, a provider of laboratory management services to health systems. Prior to joining CMS, Boehler was founder and CEO of Landmark Health, the largest provider of home-based medical care in the country.

Trump administration (2018-2021)

Center for Medicare and Medicaid Innovation 
Boehler was appointed Director of the Center for Medicare and Medicaid Innovation at the United States Department of Health and Human Services (HHS) in April 2018. While at HHS, Boehler also served as Senior Advisor for Value-based Transformation to Secretary Alex Azar and Administrator of the Centers for Medicare and Medicaid Services (CMS).

International Development Finance Corporation 
On July 10, 2019, Donald Trump announced his intent to nominate Boehler for the position of CEO of the newly formed U.S. International Development Finance Corporation, a government agency formed through the Better Utilization of Investments Leading to Development (BUILD) Act as a consolidation of the Overseas Private Investment Corporation (OPIC) and the Development Credit Authority (DCA) of the United States Agency for International Development (USAID) into one entity. The nomination was received by the Senate on July 22, 2019, and confirmed unanimously by voice vote on September 26, 2019.

Under his tenure at the IDFC, Boehler helped draft an executive order in response to COVID-19 that expanded the IDFC to domestic projects—a break from its congressional mandate, which focused on funding projects in the developing world. The IDFC's first domestic loan was a controversial $765 million loan to Kodak intended to transform the photography company into a pharmaceutical company. The Securities and Exchange Commission is investigating allegations of insider trading prior to the announcement of the Kodak loan. An investigation by the IDFC Office of Inspector General found no evidence that IDFC staff had conflicts of interest regarding the loan, and found no "evidence of misconduct on the part of DFC officials."

Boehler was part of the delegation that traveled in December 2020 with Jared Kushner to Saudi Arabia and Qatar (to discuss regional tensions), and to Israel and Morocco (to discuss the Israel–Morocco normalization agreement), as well as a delegation in October 2020 with Secretary of Treasury Steven Mnuchin to Israel, Bahrain, and UAE to discuss economic cooperation under the Abraham Accords.

Post-government career 
In 2021, Boehler started a health-care investment firm, Rubicon Founders, based in Nashville, Tennessee. The firm is focused on senior living and genomics. He is also on the Board of Directors of the Atlantic Council and a member of the United States Holocaust Memorial Council.

Personal life 
Boehler currently resides in Nashville, Tennessee with his wife, Shira, and their four children. Boehler formerly resided in New Orleans.

References

External links

1979 births
Living people
People from Albany, New York
Wharton School of the University of Pennsylvania alumni
American political consultants
United States Department of Health and Human Services officials
American chief executives
Trump administration personnel